Egbert Seymour (December 15, 1850 – February 6, 1921) was the 6th mayor of Bayonne, New Jersey, from 1895 to 1904.

Biography
Born December 15, 1850, in Walkill in upstate New York, Seymour came to Bayonne, New Jersey in the 1880s and became active in Democratic Party politics. He was elected mayor in 1895, defeating incumbent Republican mayor William C. Farr who was seeking a third term. On April 11, 1899, Seymour was elected to a second term. In 1905, Seymour ran for Hudson County sheriff, but was upset in the election by Republican John C. Kaiser. After this, Seymour withdrew from public service.

Seymour ran a butter and egg business in New York City. He was one of the founders of the Bayonne Democratic Club. He was also a leader of the Volunteer and Exempt Firemen of Bayonne. He was chairman of the Board of Directors of Bayonne Hospital.

Seymour died on February 6, 1921, in his home of influenza at age 70. He is buried in Bayview – New York Bay Cemetery in Jersey City. Coincidentally, Farr, who he defeated as mayor, died of influenza eight days later.

References

External links
 

1850 births
1921 deaths
People from Wallkill, Orange County, New York
Mayors of Bayonne, New Jersey
Deaths from influenza
Infectious disease deaths in New Jersey
Burials at Bayview – New York Bay Cemetery
New Jersey Democrats